The riel (sign: ៛; code: KHR) is the currency of Cambodia. There have been two distinct riel, the first issued between 1953 and May 1975. Between 1975 and 1980, the country had no monetary system. A second currency, also named "riel", has been issued since 20 March 1980. Since the 1990s, citizens have used the riel alongside the U.S. dollar at the well-known rate of 4,000 KHR/USD for retail payments.

Popular belief suggests that the name of the currency comes from the Mekong river fish, the riĕl ("small fish" in Khmer). It is more likely that the name derives from the high silver content Spanish-American dollar whose value is eight reales, a coin widely used for international trade in Asia and the Americas from the 16th to 19th centuries.

Concurrent use with foreign currencies
In rural areas the riel is used for virtually all purchases, large and small. However, the United States dollar is also used, particularly in urban Cambodia and tourist areas. In areas near the Thai border, the Thai baht is also accepted.

Dollarization started in the 1980s and continued to the early 90s when the United Nations contributed humanitarian aid, refugees began sending remittances home, and inflation as high as 177% per year eroded confidence in the riel. From 1991-1993, the United Nations Transitional Authority in Cambodia stationed 22,000 personnel throughout Cambodia, whose spending represented a large part of the Cambodian economy.

While the riel remains in common use in the provinces, the major cities and tourist areas heavily use the U.S. dollar. The latter is dispensed in ATMs, accepted in virtually all purchases, and USD quotations are required to price hotel rooms, airline tickets and significant financial transactions. Everyone knows the exchange rate of 4,000 KHR/US$ for retail trade, with riel paid out for change in fractions of a dollar.

In June 2020, the National Bank of Cambodia announced the phaseout from wide circulation of small U.S. dollar banknotes of $1, $2 and $5. This is aimed at reducing the cost of keeping the smaller US notes in circulation, as well as increasing the use of the riel in lieu of these notes. No fees were to be charged to collect these small notes before 31 August, 2020, but after that date banks were expected to incur costs of transporting these notes.

History

Cambodian Tical

Prior to the year 1875, the tical was the currency of Cambodia as well as Siam and Laos. However, as a result of French intervention in the region, the tical in Cambodia was replaced in 1875 by the Cambodian franc.

Cambodian Franc

The franc was the currency of Cambodia between 1875 and 1885. It was equal to the French franc and was similarly subdivided into 100 centimes. It replaced the tical and was replaced by the piastre.

French Indochinese piastre

The piastre was introduced in French Indochina in 1885 at par with the Spanish-American silver dollar, and was in use until 1952.

First riel (1953–1975)
In 1953, the Cambodia branch of the Institut d'Émission des États du Cambodge, du Laos et du Vietnam issued notes dual denominated in piastre and riel with the riel being at par with the piastre. At the same time, the two other branches of the Institut had similar arrangements with the đồng in South Vietnam and the kip in Laos. The piastre itself was derived from Spanish pieces of eight (pesos).

The riel was at first subdivided into 100 centimes (abbreviated to cent. on the coins) but this changed in 1959 to 100 sen. For the first few years, the riel and piastre circulated alongside each other. The first riel banknotes were also denominated in piastres.
 First issue, 1955–56: 1 riel, 5 riels, 10 riels, 50 riels.
 Second issue, 1956: 1 riel, 20 riels, 50 riels, 100 riels, 500 riels.
 Third issue, 1956: 100 riels, 500 riels.
 Fourth issue, 1963: 5 riels, 10 riels, 100 riels.
 Fifth issue, 1972: 100 riels*, 500 riels, 1,000 riels*, 5,000 riels*. (* Unissued.)

Coins: The 10, 20 and 50 centimes of 1953 and sen coins were minted in aluminum and were the same size as the corresponding att and xu (su) coins of Laos and South Vietnam (though without the holes in the Lao coins). A 1 riel coin about the size of a U.S. nickel was to be issued in 1970, as part of the United Nations' Food and Agriculture Organization's coin program, but was not released, perhaps due to the overthrow of the government of Norodom Sihanouk by Lon Nol.

Khmer Rouge (1975–1980, 1993–1999)

Although the Khmer Rouge printed banknotes, these notes were not issued as money was abolished after the Khmer Rouge took control of the country.
 Sixth issue, 1975: 0.1 riel (1 kak), 0.5 riels (5 kaks), 1 riel, 5 riels, 10 riels, 50 riels, 100 riels.

In 1993 they printed a series of coloured banknotes for limited use on territories controlled by them.
 Regional issue, 1993: 5 riels, 10 riels, 20 riels, 50 riels, 100 riels

Second riel (1980–present)
After the Vietnamese attacked Khmer Rouge in 1978, the riel was re-established as Cambodia's national currency on 20 March 1980, initially at a value of 4 riels = 1 U.S. dollar. It is subdivided into 10 kaks or 100 sens. Because there was no money for it to replace and a severely disrupted economy, the central government gave away the new money to the populace in order to encourage its use.

 Seventh issue, 1979: 0.1 riel (1 kak), 0.2 riels (2 kaks), 0.5 riels (5 kaks), 1 riel, 5 riels, 10 riels, 20 riels, 50 riels.
 Eighth issue, 1987: 5 riels, 10 riels.
 Ninth issue, 1990-92: 50 riels, 100 riels, 500 riels.
 Tenth issue, 1992-93: 200 riels, 1,000 riels*, 2,000 riels*. (* Unissued.)
 Eleventh issue, 1995: 1,000 riels, 2,000 riels, 5,000 riels, 10,000 riels, 20,000 riels, 50,000 riels, 100,000 riels.
 Twelfth  issue, 1995-99: 100 riels, 200 riels, 500 riels, 1,000 riels.
 Thirteenth issue, 2001-07: 50 riels, 100 riels, 500 riels, 1,000 riels, 2,000 riels, 5,000 riels, 10,000 riels, 50,000 riels.
 Fourteenth issue; 2008-15: 100 riels, 500 riels, 1,000 riels, 2,000 riels, 5,000 riels, 10,000 riels, 20,000 riels, 50,000 riels, 100,000 riels.
 Fiftheeth issue; 2016-19: 1,000 riels, 15,000 riels, 20,000 riels.
 Sixteenth issue; 2021: 30,000 riels.
 Seventeenth issue; 2022: 200, 2,000 riels.

Banknotes
 
 100 riels (2001-08-09 and 2015-01-14)
 200 riels (1995 and 2022-11-14)
 500 riels (2002-04-04 and 2014-01-14)
 1,000 riels (2006-01-06 and 2017-10-25)
 2,000 riels (2008-01-03, 2013-11-09 and 2022-11-14)
 5,000 riels (2001-04-06 and 2017-10-25)
 10,000 riels (2001-04-06 and 2015-05-07)
 15,000 riels (2019)
 20,000 riels (2008-05-12 and 2018)
 30,000 riels (2021-10-18)
 50,000 riels (2001-04-06 and 2014-05-06)
 100,000 riels (1995 and 2013-05-14)

Coins
The first coins were 5 sen pieces, minted in 1979 and made of aluminum. No more coins were minted until 1994, when denominations of 50, 100, 200 and 500 riels were introduced. However, these are rarely found in circulation.

See also
 Cambodian tical
 Cambodian franc
 Economy of Cambodia

References

External links
 Cambodian Currency Collection - Depicts every banknote issued in Cambodia
 Historical banknotes of Cambodia 

Circulating currencies
Economy of Cambodia
Currency symbols
Currencies of Cambodia
Currencies introduced in 1953
Currencies introduced in 1980